Ramakrishna Mission Multipurpose School, Kamarpukur is a secondary school in Kamarpukur, Hooghly district, West Bengal, India. It is part of the Ramakrishna Mission and affiliated to the West Bengal Board of Secondary Education. It was established in 1950 as a primary school and received government recognition as a secondary school in 1962.

References 

High schools and secondary schools in West Bengal
Schools affiliated with the Ramakrishna Mission
Schools in Hooghly district
Boarding schools in West Bengal
Educational institutions established in 1950
1950 establishments in West Bengal